Matthieu Wyart (born 1978 in Paris, France) is a French physicist. He is a professor of physics at EPFL (École Polytechnique Fédérale de Lausanne) and the head of the Physics of Complex Systems Laboratory.

Career 
Wyart studied physics, mathematics and economics at the Ecole Polytechnique in Paris and obtained a degree with honors in physics in 2001. In 2002, he received a diploma in Advanced Studies in theoretical physics with highest honors from the École normale supérieure in Paris. He then joined Jean-Philippe Bouchaud and Marc Mézard at the Service de Physique de l'Etat Condensé (SPEC) at Saclay Nuclear Research Centre (CEA Saclay) in Paris as a doctoral student. In 2006, he gained a PhD in theoretical physics and finance for a thesis on electronic markets titled On the rigidity of amorphous solids. Price fluctuations, Conventions and Microstructure of Financial Markets.

In 2005, he became an analyst in the research department of Capital Fund Management. Between 2005 and 2008 he was George Carrier Fellow at Harvard University's School of Engineering and Applied Sciences. He then joined Howard Hughes Medical Institute's Janelia Farm Campus as a research specialist. Starting in 2009, he was a visiting research specialist at the Lewis-Sigler Institute at Princeton University. He then joined New York University first as Assistant Professor in 2010 and was promoted to an associate professor position in 2014.

Since July 2015, he has been Associate Professor of Theoretical Physics in the School of Basic Sciences at EPFL. He was named a Fellow of the American Physical Society in 2021.

Research 
Wyart’s research encompassed field such as the architecture of allosteric materials, the theory of deep learning, the elasticity and mechanical stability in disordered solids, the granular and suspension flows, the glass and rigidity transitions, the marginal stability at random close packing and other glasses, and the yielding transition and elasto-plasticity.

In particular, some of his recent research is focused on the classification of the elementary excitations controlling the linear and the plastic response in amorphous materials. He has discovered that some of these excitations are marginally stable in the solid phase. This marginality fixes key aspects of structures, and suggest that the density of excitations presents a pseudo-gap. These concepts are important to understand low-temperature properties of glasses, the rheology of dense granular and suspension flows, the elasticity close to the jamming transition, the production transition in foams or metallic glass, and more broadly glassy systems with enough long-range interactions.

Distinctions 
Wyart is the recipient of the 2015 Simons Investigator Award by the Simons Foundation, Chaire Joliot (visiting professor) by the Ecole de Physique et Chimie in Paris in 2013, the 2011 Sloan Fellowship, and the 2005 G. Carrier Fellowship.

Family 
Wyart is the son of Françoise Brochard-Wyart and Pierre-Gilles de Gennes. He is married to Ksenia Tatarchenko and has two children.

Selected works

References

External links 
 
 Website of the Physics of Complex Systems Laboratory

1978 births
Living people
École Polytechnique alumni
Academic staff of the École Polytechnique Fédérale de Lausanne
French physicists
French economists
Fellows of the American Physical Society